Metatrichia is a genus of slime moulds within the family Trichiaceae. Circumscribed in 1964 by Bruce Ing, the genus currently contains six species.

Species
Metatrichia arundinariae 
Metatrichia floriformis 
Metatrichia floripara 
Metatrichia horrida 
Metatrichia rosea 
Metatrichia vesparia

References

Myxogastria
Amoebozoa genera
Taxa described in 1964